Göksun may refer to:

 Göksun, a Turkish given name.
 Göksun, is a town and district of Kahramanmaraş Province in the Mediterranean region of Turkey.